Waltham Abbey is a town in Essex, England.

Waltham Abbey may also refer to the following things in Essex, England:

 Waltham Abbey (parish), a civil parish
 Waltham Abbey Church, the abbey which gave its name to the above town
 Waltham Abbey Royal Gunpowder Mills
 Waltham Abbey F.C., based in the same town